Bannalec is a commune in the Finistère department in the Brittany region in northwestern France. Bannalec station has rail connections to Quimper, Lorient and Vannes. Bannalec is twinned with the Irish town of Castleisland.

Geography

Climate
Bannalec has a oceanic climate (Köppen climate classification Cfb).

Population
Inhabitants of Bannalec are called Bannalécois.

Breton language
In 2008, 7.91% of primary-school children attended bilingual schools, where Breton language is taught alongside French.

See also
Communes of the Finistère department
François Bazin (sculptor) Sculptor monument to aviator

References

External links

Official website 

www.bannalec.com
 Mayors of Finistère Association  ;

Communes of Finistère